Saint-Pierre-de-Plesguen is a former commune in the Ille-et-Vilaine department in Brittany in northwestern France. On 1 January 2019, it was merged into the new commune Mesnil-Roc'h.

Personalities
Hughes Felicité Robert de Lamennais lived in Saint-Pierre-de-Plesguen during the 19th century.

Population
Inhabitants of Saint-Pierre-de-Plesguen are called saint-pierrais in French.

See also
Communes of the Ille-et-Vilaine department

References

External links

 Official website 
 Cultural Heritage 

Former communes of Ille-et-Vilaine